William Sandifer III (born February 21, 1945) is an American politician. He is a member of the South Carolina House of Representatives from the 2nd District, serving since 1995. He is a member of the Republican party.

Sandifer is Chair of the House Labor, Commerce and Industry Committee.

References

External links 

Living people
1945 births
Republican Party members of the South Carolina House of Representatives
21st-century American politicians
People from Aiken County, South Carolina